Wonderful Days may refer to:

 Wonderful Days (film) or Sky Blue, a 2003 South Korean animated film
 Wonderful Days (TV series), a 2014 South Korean drama
 "Wonderful Days", a 1994 song by Charly Lownoise and Mental Theo

See also
 Wonderful Day (disambiguation)
 The Wonderful Day (disambiguation)